The flag of Mauritania is a green field containing a gold star and crescent, with two red stripes at the top and bottom of the field. The original national flag was introduced under the instructions of President Moktar Ould Daddah and the constitution of 22 March 1959 and was adopted on 1 April 1959.

On 5 August 2017, a referendum was held by president Mohamed Ould Abdel Aziz to change the national flag, abolish the senate, and other constitutional amendments. The referendum was successful, and the new flag, including two red horizontal stripes, which represent "the efforts and sacrifices that the people of Mauritania will keep consenting, to the price of their blood, to defend their territory", was adopted in time for its first raising on 28 November 2017, the 57th anniversary of Mauritania's independence from France.

It is one of the two flags of a currently Arabic-speaking country (the other being Egypt) that uses a shade of yellow. Also, like Egypt, the yellow colour is used in the central emblem (The crescent for Mauritania's flag and the Eagle of Saladin for Egypt's flag).

Design

Green, gold and red are considered Pan-African. Green is also used to symbolise Islam, and the gold is for the sands of the Sahara desert. The red stripes, which were added to the flag in 2017, represent "the efforts and sacrifices that the people of Mauritania will keep consenting, to the price of their blood, to defend their territory". The crescent and star are symbols of Islam, which is Mauritania's state religion. There was no official specification or construction sheet for the exact relative measurements of the star and crescent, except the flag's measurements of 2:3, until May 2020.

Specifications

According to Kennach (government portal of Mauritania), the flag's elements are specified as:
 Proportion = 2 : 3 and all following ratios are to width of the flag
 Width of red stripes = 20%
 Width of green area = 60%
 Width of the area of star and crescent = 40%
 Distance between lower red stripe and lower portion of the crescent = 10%
 Diameter of outer circle of the crescent = 75% (50% of length of the flag)
 Maximum width of the crescent = 10.2%
 Distance between maximum width of the crescent and base of the star = 10.7%
 Horns of the crescent are the left and right portions of outer circle
 Distance between upper red stripe and perpendicular vertex of the star = 10%
 Height of the star = 19.1% (i.e. diameter of the star becomes 21.1164%)

Use

The design acts as the national flag of Mauritania and is also used in circular form as an aircraft roundel.

Variants 
Although the constitutional amendments only mentioned the addition of red bands, officials have been using different flag's models between the change in 2017 and the official construction sheet released in 2020.

Legal basis

The current constitution of 12 July 1991 specifies that:

Unlike the seal, the exact flag is specified, not merely the right for a law to specify it at some later date. However, the flag has its official basis in the earlier constitution of 22 March 1959; no changes were made when the country declared its independence in 1960.

New flag in 2017
In 2017, a red band at the top and bottom were added to symbolise "the efforts and sacrifices that the people of Mauritania will keep consenting, to the price of their blood, to defend their territory", in a referendum on 5 August 2017, scheduled by president Mohamed Ould Abdel Aziz which contained among other constitutional amendments a modification of the national flag and anthem. First scheduled as part of a single vote, these changes proved controversial enough for them to be made into a separate vote on the same day as the vote on institutions.

See also
 Seal of Mauritania
 National anthem of Mauritania

References

External links

National symbols of Mauritania
Mauritania
Mauritania
Mauritania
Mauritania
Mauritania